Zoroastrianism in Armenia dates back as far as the fifth century BC, spreading during the Achaemenid and Parthian periods to the Armenian Highlands. Prior to the Christianization of Armenia, it was a predominantly Zoroastrian land. The yazatas (deities) Mithra (Mihr) and Verethragna (Vahagn) particularly enjoyed a high degree of reverence in the country.

Name 
The name of Zoroaster (Zarathustra) is attested in Classical Armenian sources as Zradašt (often with the variant Zradešt). The most important of these testimonies were provided by the Armenian authors Eznik of Kolb, Elishe, and Movses Khorenatsi. Elishe also provided the adjective Zradaštakan, meaning "Zoroastrian".

The spelling Zradašt was generated through an older form which started with *zur-, a fact which the German Iranologist Friedrich Carl Andreas used as evidence for a Middle Persian spoken form *Zur(a)dušt. Based on this assumption, Andreas made similar conclusions regarding the Avestan form of the name. However, modern Iranologist Rüdiger Schmitt rejects Andreas's assumption and states that the older form which started with *zur- was influenced by Armenian zur ("wrong, unjust, idle"), which therefore means that "the name must have been reinterpreted in an anti-Zoroastrian sense by the Armenian Christians". Schmitt adds: "it cannot be excluded, that the (Parthian or) Middle Persian form, which the Armenians took over (Zaradušt or the like), was merely metathesized to pre-Arm. *Zuradašt".

The word Mazdaism, a synonym for Zoroastrianism, is also attested in the earliest extant Armenian texts. The 5th-century Epic Histories (Buzandaran Patmut‘iwnk‘), written in Classical Armenian, associates magi (mogk‛, մոգք) with Mazdaism, which its anonymous author calls Mazdezn (Մազդեզն,"Mazdean faith"). This word is borrowed from Parthian *Mazdayazn and Middle Persian Māzdēsn. In the 6th century, Elishe preferred to use the word mogut‛iwn in his texts, which undoubtedly parallels the Georgian mogobay/moguebay ("Magism", i.e. "Mazdaism, Zoroastrianism") as attested in the early Georgian hagiographies. This feature is also seen in other West Asian languages; in Syriac Christian texts, for example, Mazdaism is usually referred to as mgošūtā.

History 
Zoroastrianism was introduced into Armenia during the Achaemenid era, and it was bolstered during Parthian Arsacid rule. The terminology, belief and symbolism of Zoroastrianism permeated the Armenian religious mindset and lexicon.

Extant sources of the Classical period, in addition to native Armenian sources, are used for research into the Zoroastrian Armenian pantheon and the centres of worship. The Armenologist Sergio La Porta notes in The Oxford Dictionary of Late Antiquity that six of the eight divinities whose cultic centres were mentioned by the 5th-century Armenian historian Agathangelos "clearly represent Zoroastrian yazatas or divinities worshipped in Armenia". Aramazd (Iranian Ahura Mazda, also known as Ohrmazd) was the head of the Armenian pantheon, and the center of his cult was mainly located at Ani-Kamakh (modern Kemah) and Bagavan. The worship of Anahit (Iranian Anahita, also known as Anahid) was dominant in the area of Ekeleats (Acilisene), whereas that of Vahagn (Iranian Vǝrǝthraghna, also known as Wahram) was located at Ashtishat. The cult of the divinity of Mihr (Iranian Mithra) was chiefly located at Bagayarich, and it1 featured greatly in the Armenian religious tradition. The cult of the god Tir (Iranian Tir) had its temple located at Artashat. The Semitic goddess Nane may have also been introduced into Armenia with Parthian connections.

The ancient Greek geographer and historian Strabo (64 or 63 BC – ), in his Geographica, referred to the similarity between Iranian and Armenian religious customs.

A number of Zoroastrian fire-altars have been discovered in Christian sanctuaries in Armenia. In various parts of Armenia, Zoroastrianism lingered on for several centuries even after the official adoption of Christianity. The Arsacid dynasty of Armenia, under which Armenia eventually would become a Christian nation, were pious Zoroastrians who invoked Mithra. An episode which illustrates the Armenian Arsacids' observance of the cult is the famous journey of Tiridates I to Rome in A.D. 65–66. Tiridates I, brother of Vologases I of Parthia and founder of the Arsacid dynasty of Armenia, was a Zoroastrian magus or priest.

In 53 AD, the Parthian Arsacid dynasty came into Armenia. The king, Tiridates I, is thought to have done a great amount to spread Zoroastrianism in Armenia. The Arsacid kings legitimized their rule through the authority of the Zoroastrian yazata Verethragna, the god of victory. According to Armenologist James R. Russell, Zurvanism was the form of Zoroastrianism under Yazdagird II (438–457), which he promoted in Persian Armenia.

The Armenian calendar shows influences of the Zoroastrian calendar.

According to an Armenian Christian source, the Zurvanite proselytizer Mihr Narseh, said openly: "We do not worship, like you, the elements, the sun, the moon, the winds and the fire."

Russell notes that the Armenian Cross incorporates influences from Armenia's Zoroastrian past. As Zoroastrian traditions were very much integrated into Armenian spiritual and material culture, they survived the zealotry of the Sasanian priest Kartir and his successors, and they were ultimately incorporated into Armenian Christianity. Russell adds: "The Armenian Cross itself is supported on tongues of flame and has at its center not the body of Christ, but a sunburst".

The Armenologist Nina Garsoian states that—although the Christianization of Armenia separated it from the Zoroastrian world it had once been part of—the Zoroastrian mythology "had sunk so deep in the Armenian popular tradition that early Armenian Christian writers were apparently forced to alter Biblical stories in order to make their evangelizing mission comprehensible to their hearers". By the second half of the 4th century, the catholicoi of the Armenian Church still officially used the title of Zoroastrian priests (mowbed) namely "Defender of the dispossessed" (Middle Persian: driγōšān jātakgōw, Armenian: Jagatow amenayn zrkelocʿ). However, Armenia post-Christianization gradually withdrew from the Iranian spiritual tradition, and its resistance to Sasanian Zoroastrianism soon also turned into opposition against the Christian national church of the Sasanians, the Church of the East.

Arewordikʿ
Reports indicate that there were Zoroastrian Armenians in Armenia until the 1920s. This small group of Armenian Zoroastrians that had survived through the centuries were known as the Arewordikʿ ("Children of the Sun"). They had never converted to Christianity and had survived the several massacres of Armenians in Western Armenia at the turn of the 20th century, including both the Hamidian massacres and the Armenian genocide. Medieval Armenian sources narrate that the Arewordikʿ were never converted by Gregory the Illuminator, the patron saint and first official head of the Armenian Apostolic Church, and that they had been "infected" by Zradasht (Zoroaster). The Arewordikʿ were specifically distinguished from Christian sects whose adherents were deemed heretics (such as the Paulicians and Tondrakians). The Arewordikʿ had seemingly taught the Paulicians and Tondrakians "to expose the dead on rooftops instead of burying them", which indicates that burial and exposure of the dead was practiced in Armenia as in Iran.

The Arewordikʿ spoke the Armenian language and, as Russell notes, revered the poplar and all heliotropic plants. Russell adds: "A tree which is either a poplar or a cypress, probably the latter, which is particularly revered by the Zoroastrians, appears on an Artaxiad coin." The Arewordikʿ Armenians offered sacrifices for the souls of the dead, and the leader of the Arewordikʿ was called the Hazarpet (cf. Iranian Hazarbed). The Arewordikʿ were known to populate four villages in the area of Mardin (present-day southeastern Turkey) in the late 14th century, and others inhabited Samosata (modern Samsat, Turkey) and Amida (modern Diyarbakır, Turkey). In the town of Marsovan (modern Merzifon, Turkey), in the early 20th century, the Armenian quarter was known as "Arewordi". Furthermore, a cemetery outside the town was known as "Arewordii grezman", and an Armenian owner of a close by vineyard was named "Arewordean", Armenian for "Arewordi-son".

Controversy, assessment and issues in scholarship
The historian of ancient religions Albert de Jong notes that although the Armenians and eastern Georgians (referred to as Iberians by Classical authors) were Zoroastrians prior to their conversion to Christianity, this is not an obvious historic fact to most people. It has been vehemently opposed, in particular by Armenian and Georgian scholars, who, as de Jong adds, "prefer to think of the pre‐Christian religions of the Armenians and Georgians as chiefly 'local' or 'indigenous' traditions, which accommodated some Iranian elements". De Jong continues:

Within this matter, confusion has been created mainly due to the works of historians of Zoroastrianism, who often interpret it as an "identity" dominating all others. Furthermore, these same historians employ a very tightly restricted delineation of what is "real" Zoroastrianism. This essentialist definition only closely reflects the Sasanian version of Zoroastrianism. Many scholars, failing to recognize this fact, have resorted to using this version of the Zoroastrian religion, which is historically and culturally very specific, as a standard by which to consider the evidence for the non-Sasanian versions of Zoroastrianism. De Jong adds that this approach is not only anachronistic—for example, it measures Parthian Zoroastrianism to standards that existed only after the fall of the Parthian Empire—but also "anatopistic" in disregarding the probability of zonal developments in Zoroastrianism past the borders of the central regions of the Sasanian Empire. Both are existing problems in relation to Armenian (and Georgian) Zoroastrianism. Although the extant Zoroastrian evidence from Armenia (and Georgia) is scant and not easy to clarify, it is of major value for questioning the viability of most current methods that assess the history of Zoroastrianism.

See also 
 Battle of Avarayr
 Armenian mythology
 Satrapy of Armenia

Notes

References

Sources

Further reading 
 

 
Religion in Armenia
Armenia